"Husavik" (also known as "Húsavík" or "Husavik (My Hometown)") is a song performed by Will Ferrell and Molly Sandén (under the stage name My Marianne) for the film Eurovision Song Contest: The Story of Fire Saga (2020). The song was written by Fat Max Gsus, Rickard Göransson, and Savan Kotecha, and received a nomination for Best Original Song at the 93rd Academy Awards.

Context
The song can be first heard when Sigrit (Rachel McAdams) was writing a song and playing the piano after returning to her hotel room. Lars (Will Ferrell) overhears Sigrit working on a new song, not knowing that it was a song she dedicated to him. Lars wrongly concludes that it was a love song for Alexander (Dan Stevens), another contestant in the Eurovision Song Contest.

The song is sung during the finals of the contest after Lars arrives just in time for the grand final after asking for a ride from some initially unwilling American tourists. Instead of their official entry "Double Trouble", Sigrit and Lars perform "Husavik", an ode to their hometown. Since Fire Saga changed the song for the finals, they are disqualified from the contest but "won the hearts of the people". Lars and Sigrit kiss after performing the song.

Accolades
"Husavik" was nominated for Best Original Song at the 93rd Academy Awards. It was also nominated for Best Song at the 26th Critics' Choice Awards and for Best Original Song in a Feature Film at the 11th Hollywood Music in Media Awards.

At the 2021 Society of Composers and Lyricists Awards, "Husavik" won Outstanding Original Song for Visual Media. It won the Hollywood Critics Association Awards for Best Original Song.

The town of Húsavík, which is described in the song, has adopted it as their local anthem.

Music video
Sandén released a music video for an acoustic version of "Husavik (My Hometown)" in August 2020. Filmed on Öland, the video features accompaniment by pianist Pontus Persson. Sandén had previously shared a performance of an acoustic version of the song through an Instagram account for her My Marianne persona; the video features piano accompaniment by David Karl Larson of the Royal Concept.
As of July 2022, the music video has reached 16 million views on YouTube

Tracklist
Cahill remix
"Husavik (My Hometown)" (Cahill remix) – 3:51

Charts

References

2020 songs
Iceland in fiction
Icelandic-language songs
Male–female vocal duets
Molly Sandén songs
Macaronic songs
Music videos shot in Sweden
Songs about cities
Songs written by Rickard Göransson
Songs written by Savan Kotecha
Songs written for films
Works by Will Ferrell